The 6 Hours of Zhuhai is a sports car endurance race held at the Zhuhai International Circuit in Zhuhai, Guangdong, China.  The race was first held in 1994 on a street circuit as a round of the BPR Global GT Series.  It was held 7 times in 14 years in BPR and the FIA GT Championship, and revived in 2010 under the Intercontinental Le Mans Cup.

Results

External links
Racing Sports Cars: Zhuhai archive

 
Recurring sporting events established in 1994